Edward Thomson may refer to:
Edward Thomson (bishop) (1810–1870) American bishop of the Methodist Episcopal Church.
Edward Deas Thomson (1800–1879), Australian administrator and politician
Edward Hughes Thomson (1810–1886), American lawyer and politician in Michigan
Edward William Thomson (1794–1865), Canadian farmer and politician
Edward William Thomson (writer) (1849–1924), Canadian writer and journalist
Eddie Thomson (1947–2003), Scottish footballer

See also
Edward Thompson (disambiguation)